Wiehle–Reston East (preliminary names Wiehle Avenue, Reston–Wiehle Avenue) is a Washington Metro station in Fairfax County, Virginia on the Silver Line. Located in Reston, the station is situated alongside Reston Station, a mixed-use urban center. Upon its opening, Wiehle–Reston East was the western terminus of the Silver Line until November 15, 2022, when service was extended to the new westernmost terminus at Ashburn station.

Characteristics
The station is located within the median of Virginia State Route 267, similar to the Orange Line, which travels within the median of Interstate 66 between Ballston and Vienna. It has approximately 2,300 parking spaces to the north of the road.

The station was the staging point for the Metropolitan Washington Airports Authority's Silver Line Express Bus, which traveled in about 15 minutes between the station and Washington Dulles International Airport every 15 to 20 minutes with a fare of $5.00 until the opening of Phase 2 of the Silver Line. The Fairfax Connector Route 983 bus travels to the Airport and the Smithsonian National Air and Space Museum's Udvar-Hazy Center every 20 minutes, while the Connector's Route 981 bus travels to the Airport when the Center is closed.

History
The "Wiehle" in the station's name refers to Wiehle Avenue at the eastern end of the station, which itself is named after a small town, Wiehle's Station, built in 1892 that used to be located nearby.

In order to foster high density development within walking distance of the station, Fairfax County awarded development rights to an existing  park-and-ride lot on the station site.

This station reopened beginning on August 16, 2020 when trains were able to bypass East Falls Church station.

On October 31, 2022, WMATA announced that the Phase 2 extension will open on November 15, 2022, which will extend Silver Line trains to Ashburn station. The extension opened on time with an opening ceremony.

Station facilities
2 station entrances (both sides of SR 267)
Pedestrian bridge crossing SR 267
Bus dropoff/pickup (both entrances)
Kiss & Ride (north side only)
Secure bike storage room
Parking for 2,300 cars (north side)

Station layout

Gallery

References

External links

Railway stations in the United States opened in 2014
Stations on the Silver Line (Washington Metro)
Transportation in Fairfax County, Virginia
Washington Metro stations in Virginia
2014 establishments in Virginia
Railway stations in highway medians